Archolaemus is a genus of South American glass knifefishes. They occur in fast-flowing sections of rivers, including rapids, in the Amazon, Tocantins, São Francisco and Araguari basins. During the day they hide in rocky crevices, but during the night they are active and feed on small invertebrates such as aquatic insect larvae.

Species
There are currently six recognized species in this genus:

References

Sternopygidae
Freshwater fish of South America
Freshwater fish genera